The 1950 World Table Tennis Championships men's doubles was the 17th edition of the men's doubles championship.
Ferenc Sidó and Ferenc Soos won the title after defeating Ivan Andreadis and František Tokár  in the final by three sets to one.

Results

See also
 List of World Table Tennis Championships medalists

References

-